The Indian spotted chevrotain (Moschiola indica) is a species of even-toed ungulate in the family Tragulidae. It is native to India and possibly Nepal. It lives in rainforests and is nocturnal.
This was earlier included under the name of Tragulus meminna, but studies on the systematics of the group have led to that name being restricted to the Sri Lankan spotted chevrotain.

References

External links

America Zoo

spotted chevrotain, Indian
Mammals of India
Indian spotted chevrotain
Indian spotted chevrotain